North American Aerospace Defense Command (NORAD ), known until March 1981 as the North American Air Defense Command, is a combined organization of the United States and Canada that provides aerospace warning, air sovereignty, and protection for Canada, the continental United States, and Alaska. 

Headquarters for NORAD and the NORAD/United States Northern Command (USNORTHCOM) center are located at Peterson Space Force Base in El Paso County, near Colorado Springs, Colorado.  The nearby Cheyenne Mountain Complex has the Alternate Command Center.  The NORAD commander and deputy commander (CINCNORAD) are, respectively, a United States four-star general or equivalent and a Canadian lieutenant-general or equivalent.

Command
NORAD is headed by its commander, who is a four-star general or admiral in the United States Armed Forces. The deputy commander is a Royal Canadian Air Force lieutenant general. Prior to the 1968 unification of the Canadian Forces, the deputy commander was an RCAF air marshal.

The commander is responsible to the Government of Canada (the Crown-in-Council), through the chief of the Defence Staff, and to the Government of the United States, via the chairman of the joint chiefs of staff. The commander and deputy are each subject to their respective country's laws, policies, and directives. Per the Canadian National Defence Act, the chief of the Defence Staff relays orders from either the Crown-in-Council, collectively, or the minister of national defence, alone, to the officers of the Canadian Armed Forces.

Regions
CINCNORAD maintains the NORAD headquarters at Peterson Space Force Base near Colorado Springs, Colorado. The NORAD and USNORTHCOM Command Center at Peterson SFB serves as a central collection and coordination facility for a worldwide system of sensors designed to provide the commander and the leadership of Canada and the U.S. with an accurate picture of any aerospace or maritime threat. NORAD has administratively divided the North American landmass into three regions: 
Alaska NORAD (ANR) Region – Eleventh Air Force (11 AF)
Canadian NORAD (CANR) Region – 1 Canadian Air Division (1 Cdn Air Div)
Continental U.S. (CONR) Region – First Air Force (1 AF/CONR-AFNORTH)

Both the CONR and CANR regions are divided into eastern and western sectors.

Alaskan
The Alaskan NORAD Region (ANR) maintains continuous capability to detect, validate and warn off any atmospheric threat in its area of operations from its Regional Operations Control Center (ROCC) at Joint Base Elmendorf–Richardson, Alaska.

ANR also maintains the readiness to conduct a continuum of aerospace control missions, which include daily air sovereignty in peacetime, contingency and deterrence in time of tension, and active air defense against manned and unmanned air-breathing atmospheric vehicles in times of crisis.

ANR is supported by both active duty and reserve units. Active duty forces are provided by 11 AF and the Canadian Armed Forces (CAF), and reserve forces provided by the Alaska Air National Guard. Both 11 AF and the CAF provide active duty personnel to the ROCC to maintain continuous surveillance of Alaskan airspace.

Canadian
Canadian NORAD Region Headquarters is at CFB Winnipeg, Manitoba. It was established on 22 April 1983. It is responsible for providing surveillance and control of Canadian airspace. The Royal Canadian Air Force provides alert assets to NORAD. CANR is divided into two sectors, which are designated as the Canada East Sector and Canada West Sector. Both Sector Operations Control Centers (SOCCs) are co-located at CFB North Bay, Ontario. The routine operation of the SOCCs includes reporting track data, sensor status and aircraft alert status to NORAD headquarters. In 1996 CANR was renamed 1 Canadian Air Division and moved to CFB Winnipeg.

Canadian air defense forces assigned to NORAD include 409 Tactical Fighter Squadron at CFB Cold Lake, Alberta and 425 Tactical Fighter Squadron at CFB Bagotville, Quebec.  All squadrons fly the McDonnell Douglas CF-18 Hornet fighter aircraft.

To monitor for drug trafficking, in cooperation with the Royal Canadian Mounted Police and the United States drug law enforcement agencies, the Canadian NORAD Region monitors all air traffic approaching the coast of Canada.  Any aircraft that has not filed a flight plan may be directed to land and be inspected by RCMP and Canada Border Services Agency.

Continental U.S.

The Continental NORAD Region (CONR) is the component of NORAD that provides airspace surveillance and control and directs air sovereignty activities for the Contiguous United States (CONUS). Since the terrorist attacks of September 11, 2001, CONR has been the lead agency for Operation Noble Eagle, an ongoing mission to protect the continental United States from airborne attacks.

CONR is the NORAD designation of the United States Air Force First Air Force/AFNORTH. Its headquarters is located at Tyndall Air Force Base, Florida. The First Air Force (1 AF) became responsible for the USAF air defense mission on 30 September 1990. AFNORTH is the United States Air Force component of United States Northern Command (NORTHCOM).

1 AF/CONR-AFNORTH comprises Air National Guard Fighter Wings assigned an air defense mission to 1 AF/CONR-AFNORTH on federal orders, made up primarily of citizen Airmen. The primary weapons systems are the McDonnell Douglas F-15 Eagle and General Dynamics F-16 Fighting Falcon aircraft.

It plans, conducts, controls, coordinates and ensures air sovereignty and provides for the unilateral defense of the United States. It is organized with a combined First Air Force command post at Tyndall Air Force Base and two Sector Operations Control Centers (SOCC) at Rome, New York, for the US East ROCC (Eastern Air Defense Sector) and McChord Field, Washington for the US West ROCC (Western Air Defense Sector) manned by active duty personnel to maintain continuous surveillance of CONUS airspace.

In its role as the CONUS NORAD Region, 1 AF/CONR-AFNORTH also performs counter-drug surveillance operations.

History
The North American Air Defense Command was recommended by the Joint Canadian–U.S. Military Group in late 1956, approved by the U.S. Joint Chiefs of Staff in February 1957, and announced on 1 August 1957. NORAD's command headquarters was established on 12 September 1957 at Ent Air Force Base's 1954 blockhouse. In 1958, Canada and the United States agreed that the NORAD commander would always be a United States officer, with a Canadian vice commander, and Canada "agreed the command's primary purpose would be ... early warning and defense for the Strategic Air Command's (SAC)'s retaliatory forces". In late 1958, Canada and the United States started the Continental Air Defense Integration North (CADIN) for the Semi-Automatic Ground Environment air defense network. The initial CADIN cost-sharing agreement between the two countries was signed off on 5 January 1959. Two December 1958 plans submitted by NORAD had "average yearly expenditure of around five and one half billions", including "cost of the accelerated Nike Zeus program" and three Ballistic Missile Early Warning System (BMEWS) sites.

Canada's NORAD bunker at CFB North Bay with a SAGE AN/FSQ-7 Combat Direction Central computer was constructed from 1959 to 1963, and each of the USAF's eight smaller AN/FSQ-8 Combat Control Central systems provided NORAD with data and could command the entire United States air defense. The RCAF's 1950 "ground observer system, the Long Range Air Raid Warning System", was discontinued and on 31 January 1959, the United States Ground Observer Corps was deactivated. The Cheyenne Mountain nuclear bunker's planned mission was expanded in August 1960 to "a hardened center from which CINCNORAD would supervise and direct operations against space attack as well as air attack" The Secretary of Defense assigned on 7 October 1960, "operational command of all space surveillance to Continental Air Defense Command (CONAD) and operational control to North American Air Defense Command (NORAD)".

The Joint Chiefs of Staff (JCS) placed the Ent Air Force Base Space Detection and Tracking System (496L System with Philco 2000 Model 212 computer) "under the operational control of CINCNORAD on December 1, 1960"; during Cheyenne Mountain nuclear bunker excavation, and the joint SAC-NORAD exercise "Sky Shield II"—and on 2 September 1962—"Sky Shield III" were conducted for mock penetration of NORAD sectors.

NORAD command center operations moved from Ent Air Force Base to the 1963 partially underground "Combined Operations Center" for Aerospace Defense Command and NORAD at the Chidlaw Building.  President John F. Kennedy visited "NORAD headquarters" after the 5 June 1963 United States Air Force Academy graduation and on 30 October 1964, "NORAD began manning" the Combat Operations Center in the Cheyenne Mountain Complex.  By 1965, about 250,000 United States and Canadian personnel were involved in the operation of NORAD, On 1 January 1966, Air Force Systems Command turned the COC over to NORAD  The NORAD Cheyenne Mountain Complex was accepted on 8 February 1966.

1968 reorganization
United States Department of Defense realignments for the NORAD command organization began by 15 November 1968 (e.g., Army Air Defense Command (ARADCOM)) and by 1972, there were eight NORAD "regional areas ... for all air defense", and the NORAD Cheyenne Mountain Complex Improvements Program (427M System) became operational in 1979.

False alarms
On at least three occasions, NORAD systems failed, such as on 9 November 1979, when a technician in NORAD loaded a test tape, but failed to switch the system status to "test", causing a stream of constant false warnings to spread to two "continuity of government" bunkers as well as command posts worldwide. On 3 June 1980, and again on 6 June 1980, a computer communications device failure caused warning messages to sporadically flash in U.S. Air Force command posts around the world that a nuclear attack was taking place. During these incidents, Pacific Air Forces (PACAF) properly had their planes (loaded with nuclear bombs) in the air; Strategic Air Command (SAC) did not and received criticism, because they did not follow procedure, even though the SAC command knew these were almost certainly false alarms, as did PACAF. Both command posts had recently begun receiving and processing direct reports from the various radar, satellite, and other missile attack detection systems, and those direct reports simply did not match the erroneous data received from NORAD.

1980 reorganization

Following the 1979 Joint US-Canada Air Defense Study, the command structure for aerospace defense was changed, e.g., "SAC assumed control of ballistic missile warning and space surveillance facilities" on 1 December 1979 from ADCOM. The Aerospace Defense Command major command ended 31 March 1980. and its organizations in Cheyenne Mountain became the "ADCOM" specified command under the same commander as NORAD, e.g., HQ NORAD/ADCOM J31 manned the Space Surveillance Center. By 1982, a NORAD Off-site Test Facility was located at Peterson AFB. The DEW Line was to be replaced with the North Warning System (NWS); the Over-the-Horizon Backscatter (OTH-B) radar was to be deployed; more advanced fighters were deployed, and E-3 Sentry AWACS aircraft were planned for greater use. These recommendations were accepted by the governments in 1985.  The United States Space Command was formed in September 1985 as an adjunct, but not a component of NORAD.

NORAD was renamed North American Aerospace Defense Command in March 1981.

Post–Cold War
In 1989 NORAD operations expanded to cover counter-drug operations, for example, tracking of small aircraft entering and operating within the United States and Canada. DEW line sites were replaced between 1986 and 1995 by the North Warning System. The Cheyenne Mountain site was also upgraded, but none of the proposed OTH-B radars are currently in operation.

After the September 11 attacks, the NORAD Air Warning Center's mission included the interior airspace of North America.

The Cheyenne Mountain Realignment was announced on 28 July 2006, to consolidate NORAD's day-to-day operations at Peterson Air Force Base with Cheyenne Mountain in "warm standby" staffed with support personnel.

In popular culture

Movies and television 

The NORAD command center located under Cheyenne Mountain, Colorado is a setting of the 1983 film WarGames and the television series Jeremiah and Stargate SG-1. In the 1996 science fiction film Independence Day, NORAD was destroyed by the alien invaders. In the 2014 film Interstellar, NORAD dissolves and its headquarters is converted for NASA.

In season 25 episode 4 of the TV series South Park, NORAD is hacked into by Mr Mackey using late 1980s computer hardware.

Santa tracker 

As a publicity move on 24 December 1955, NORAD's predecessor, the Continental Air Defense Command (CONAD), informed the press that CONAD was tracking Santa Claus's sleigh, adding that "CONAD, Army, Navy and Marine Air Forces will continue to track and guard Santa and his sleigh on his trip to and from the U.S. against possible attack from those who do not believe in Christmas", and a Christmas Eve tradition was born, known as the "NORAD Tracks Santa" program. Every year on Christmas Eve, "NORAD Tracks Santa" purports to track Santa Claus as he leaves the North Pole and delivers presents to children around the world. Today, NORAD relies on volunteers to make the program possible.

See also
 154th Wing
 Air Forces Northern National Security Emergency Preparedness Directorate
 Commander of the North American Aerospace Defense Command
 Joint Surveillance System, (of USAF & FAA), replaces SAGE
 Main Centre for Missile Attack Warning, a Soviet/Russian equivalent.

References

Further reading
 Andrea Charron, James Fergusson: NORAD: In Perpetuity and Beyond. McGill-Queen's/Brian Mulroney Institute of Government Studies in Leadership, Public Policy, and Governance. McGill-Queen's University Press, Montreal 2022. ISBN 978-0-2280-1400-3.

External links

 

 
Multinational units and formations
Cheyenne Mountain Complex
Organizations based in Colorado Springs, Colorado
Military units and formations in Colorado
Military units and formations established in 1958
Canada–United States military relations
Military alliances involving Canada
1958 in military history
1955 in military history
1958 establishments in Colorado